Bellarmine may refer to:

Robert Bellarmine (1542–1621), a Cardinal and saint of the Catholic Church
The schools named after him:
Bellarmine University, in Louisville, Kentucky
Bellarmine College Preparatory, in San Jose, California
Bellarmine Preparatory School, in Tacoma, Washington
Bellarmine-Jefferson_High_School, in Burbank, California
St Robert Bellarmine (K-8) School, Flushing MI
 The Bellarmine Knights, the athletic program of Bellarmine University
A type of stoneware jug, as known as either a Bellarmine jug or a Bartmann jug